Utricularia aureomaculata is a small, probably annual, lithophyte carnivorous plant that belongs to the genus Utricularia. U. aureomaculata is endemic to Venezuela and is only known from three locations: the type location on Ptari-tepui in the Venezuelan state of Bolívar, one other location from Ptari-tepuí, and also from Amaruay-tepui. It grows as a terrestrial lithophyte on moist mossy bluffs. It has been collected in flower in May, October, and November. It was originally described and published by Julian Alfred Steyermark in 1953.

See also 
 List of Utricularia species

References 

Carnivorous plants of South America
Flora of Venezuela
aureomaculata
Flora of the Tepuis